The 1983 South American Championships in Athletics were held in Santa Fe, Argentina, between 29 September and 2 October.

Medal summary

Men's events

Women's events

Medal table

See also
 1983 in athletics (track and field)

External links
 Men Results – GBR Athletics
 Women Results – GBR Athletics
 Medallist

S
South American Championships in Athletics
1983 in South American sport
International athletics competitions hosted by Argentina
Ath